{{Speciesbox
|status = LC
|status_system = IUCN3.1
|status_ref = 
|genus = Tiquilia
|species = fusca|authority = Hook.f.
}}Tiquilia fusca'' is a species of flowering plant in the family Boraginaceae. It is endemic to the Galápagos Islands.

References

Flora of the Galápagos Islands
fusca
Least concern plants
Taxonomy articles created by Polbot
Taxobox binomials not recognized by IUCN